Chizi Kaka Chinda (born 22 October 1993 in Port Harcourt, Rivers State) is a Nigerian footballer who last played with  Nigeria Professional Football League side Rivers United F.C.

Career 
Chinda started his career with home country side Ocean Boys F.C. He previously played professionally for Maldives top-flight sides Victory 2012-2015 and Valencia from 2015 to 2017. He returned to Nigeria in 2018 where he joined Nigerian Professional Football League club Lobi Stars for a season.

Rivers United 
Chinda later in 2018 joined Nigeria Professional Football League outfit Rivers United F.C. on a one-year contract.

References

External links 
 Soccerway

Living people
1993 births
Nigerian footballers
Nigerian expatriate footballers
Expatriate footballers in the Maldives
Club Valencia players
Victory Sports Club players
Association football midfielders
Sportspeople from Port Harcourt